Friedrich-Rückert-Preis is a literary prize of the city of Schweinfurt, Bavaria, Germany.

Literary awards of Bavaria